An alleged demonic possession occurred in May 1953 when Clarita Villanueva, a 17-year-old girl incarcerated at the Manila City Jail was said to have been bitten and tormented by two demonic entities. But, Clarita mentions that her two demons have followers. American pastor Lester Sumrall flew to Manila, Philippines, in order to deliver the girl from the evil spirits. The case has been widely and sensationally reported worldwide.

Background 

Clarita Villanueva whose mother was a spiritist and fortune teller, never knew her father. When she was 12 years old, her mother died, forcing her into a life of prostitution. She did not have an immediate family to take care of her and she became a vagabond. From her island province home, she made her way into the capital city of Manila in the summer of 1953 looking for her father and settled in the district of Malate. Clarita was frequenting the bars and taverns of the city and soliciting men for harlotry. In May 6, 1953, she mistakenly offered her service to a plainclothes police officer and was incarcerated at the Old Bilibid Prison (now Manila City Jail), since she was a minor and prostitution is a crime in the city. According to the grandson of the judge who handled Clarita's case, she was possessed in the middle of a hearing.

Clarita described her attackers as a "very big dark man with curly hair all over the body" and "a body with an angelic face and a big mustache". Sumrall also claims that Clarita is Visayan and can only speak the Tagalog language. However, she was able to speak English during the alleged possession.

Timeline

May 10 

Clarita Villanueva was arrested on charges of vagrancy. It was unclear, however, if she was also arrested on charges of prostitution.

May 19 

Clarita was surrounded by "about 100 medical specialists, nurses and Pressmen" according to Rodolfo Nazareno, a pressmen for the United Press. According to records, this was the first day when Pastor Lester Sumrall and Clarita Villanueva met, with the girl stating her hatred towards the pastor and God, and making blasphemous statements.

May 20 

Manila Mayor Arsenio Lacson, who received reports about the incident, ordered that Clarita be brought to the city morgue so that he could see for himself. Within 15 minutes of sitting beside next to her, bite marks appeared on her index finger and neck. Lacson said that he saw the marks of a human teeth where Clarita had been bitten, and that "they were not made by her". Lacson was holding her hands when she was bitten. Clarita had been examined and was declared as mentally sound.

May 22 

After three days of confrontation, Sumrall stated that the miracle of God came upon her and that Clarita said "He (the devil) went that way" and "He's gone". The third day was the final time that the demons reportedly tormented her before fleeing in defeat.

In popular culture 

 The 2019 Filipino supernatural horror film Clarita was based on the events.
 Kapuso Mo, Jessica Soho featured a story regarding the incident on Gabi ng Lagim IV.

References

Further reading 

 Sumrall, Lester (1995). Alien Entities. A look behind the door to the spirit realm. Printed in the US by Whitaker House (PA), 1995, pages 131-138

1953 in the Philippines
20th century in Manila
Prostitution in the Philippines
Demonic possession